Alessandro Lodigiani (born 5 September 1980) is an Italian lightweight rower. He won a gold medal at the 2004 World Rowing Championships in Banyoles with the lightweight men's quadruple scull.

References

1980 births
Living people
Italian male rowers
World Rowing Championships medalists for Italy